Bridge Ndilu (born 21 July 2000) is a French professional footballer who plays as a forward for  club Cholet on loan from Nantes.

Club career
Ndilu played for Stade Lavallois from 2017 to 2019, turning professional in 2018. There he gained much game time in France's Championnat National raising the attention of clubs such as Juventus with a potential €4 million transfer fee. He eventually was transferred to FC Nantes on 24 June 2019.

Ndilu made his professional debut for Nantes in a 2–0 Coupe de France win over Aviron Bayonnais on 4 January 2020.

Although Ndilu's emergence in the professional team was tempered by the arrival of forwards such as Renaud Emond, his manager Christian Gourcuff in January 2020 expressed confidence that Ndilu would eventually make his way to the Ligue 1 first team.

On 31 August 2021, he joined Ligue 2 club Quevilly-Rouen on loan.

On 17 September 2022, Ndilu was loaned to Cholet in Championnat National for the season.

International career
Born in France, Ndilu is of Congolese descent. Ndilu represented the France U19s at the 2018 UEFA European Under-19 Championship.

References

External links
 
 
 

2000 births
Footballers from Le Mans
French sportspeople of Democratic Republic of the Congo descent
Black French sportspeople
Living people
French footballers
France youth international footballers
Association football forwards
Stade Lavallois players
FC Nantes players
US Quevilly-Rouen Métropole players
SO Cholet players
Ligue 1 players
Ligue 2 players
Championnat National players
Championnat National 2 players
Championnat National 3 players